The 19th Dáil was elected at the 1969 general election on 18 June 1969 and met on 2 July 1969. The members of Dáil Éireann, the house of representatives of the Oireachtas (legislature) of Ireland, are known as TDs. On 5 February 1973, President Éamon de Valera dissolved the Dáil on the request of Taoiseach Jack Lynch. The 19th Dáil lasted  days.

Composition of the 19th Dáil

Fianna Fáil, denoted with bullet, formed the 13th Government of Ireland, a majority government.

Graphical representation
This is a graphical comparison of party strengths in the 19th Dáil from July 1969. This was not the official seating plan.

Ceann Comhairle
On the meeting of the Dáil, Cormac Breslin (FF), who had served as Ceann Comhairle from November 1967, was proposed by Jack Lynch (FF) and seconded by Liam Cosgrave (FG) for the position. His election was approved without a vote.

TDs by constituency
The list of the 144 TDs elected is given in alphabetical order by Dáil constituency.

Changes

See also
Members of the 12th Seanad

References

External links
Houses of the Oireachtas: Debates: 19th Dáil

 
19
19th Dáil